The United Nations Memorial Cemetery in Korea (UNMCK), located at Tanggok in the Nam District, City of Busan,  Republic of Korea, is a burial ground for United Nations Command (UNC) casualties of the Korean War. It contains 2,300 graves and is the only United Nations cemetery in the world.

History

Temporary battlefield cemeteries and remains recovery 
The Korean War began when North Korean People's Army forces attacked south in June 1950. As the fighting progressed, temporary military cemeteries for battle casualties were established by United Nations forces near the towns of Taejon (9 July 1950), Kwan-ui (Kwan-ni), Kum-chon, and Sindong. When the North Korean forces pushed towards Busan, these cemeteries had to be abandoned. Later, as the Battle of Pusan Perimeter developed, temporary cemeteries were established at Masan, Miryang, and Taegu, with a Busan cemetery being established on 11 July 1950. As the fighting pushed into North Korea, temporary cemeteries were established in or near the towns of Kaesong, Sukehon, Wonsan, Pupchong (Pukchong County), Yudarn-ni and Koto-ri. Some eleven division-level cemeteries were established in the first two months of fighting and later five UN military cemeteries were established in North Korea.

At the beginning of the war, the nearest U.S. Army mortuary affairs unit was the 108th Graves Registration Platoon in Yokohama, Japan, which was searching for the remains of missing World War II American airmen.  The only other American active duty graves registration unit was at Ft. Bragg, North Carolina. The 108th was reconfigured as the 114th Graves Registration Company and deployed to establish temporary cemeteries at Hungnam, Pyongyang, and Suchon as the fighting continued. Supporting the 2nd Infantry Division was the Graves Registration Section of the second Quartermaster Company, which collected the remains of Allied and American soldiers to be further processed by the 148th Graves Registration Company. When UN forces launched the Inchon Invasion in September 1950, a platoon from the 565th Graves Registration Company accompanied them. Other mortuary affairs units included the 293rd Graves Registration Company, activated in April 1951. It was difficult to recover remains and conduct burials in Korea, due to the rugged geography and harsh climate, and the threat of unexploded ordnance and booby-traps.

Construction of the Tanggok cemetery 
Construction of the United Nations Military Cemetery (UNMC) at Tanggok began on 18 January 1951 and was carried out by hand-labor over a  site. It was dedicated by General Matthew Ridgway on 6 April 1951. Graves Registration units then concentrated American and allied remains at Tanggok before they were permanently buried or repatriated. Besides burial services, refrigeration units to store remains were added, as were cremation facilities. Casualties from the Colombia Battalion were cremated at Tanggok by the American Graves Registration Service and then repatriated to Colombia in 1954. Today the 2,300 graves in the cemetery are set out in 22 sites designated by the nationalities of the buried service members.

Post-armistice 
Following the signing of the Korean Armistice Agreement in July 1953, the United Nations Command sought to recover bodies interred in North Korean territory. Cemeteries for POWs in North Korea were established at 16 POW camps.  From September to October 1954, the resulting exchange of casualties, dubbed Operation Glory, between United Nations forces and the North Koreans resulted in 4,219 remains being recovered, of which 1,275 were non-US casualties. (Also exchanged were the remains of approximately 14,000 North Korean and Chinese casualties.) From 1950 to 1954, approximately 11,000 casualties were interred at UNMC, which was maintained by the United States Army Graves Registration Agency.

Foundation as a United Nations cemetery and transfer to CUNMCK 
It was officially established as the United Nations Memorial Cemetery on 15 December 1955 with the passage of UN General Assembly Resolution 977(X). Following the war, the cemetery was funded from the United Nations budget, but the Sino-Soviet world objected to this funding. In 1973, the cemetery was transferred from the UN to the Commission for the United Nations Memorial Cemetery (CUNMCK), which is composed of representatives from the 11 countries who have servicemembers buried there.

Cultural heritage and tourism 
The cemetery is designated as Site 359 in the listing of Registered Cultural Heritage Sites in Korea by the Cultural Heritage Administration of Korea. Also, it is a visitor attraction for Pacific Rim tourists. In 2011, United Nations Secretary-General Ban Ki-moon described it as the only United Nations cemetery in the world.

Memorials 

An Honour Guard from the Republic of Korea 53rd Division carries out flag ceremonies daily.

The UN Sculpture Park was established in October 2001 and twenty-nine permanent memorials are in the cemetery. The memorials include:
 Commonwealth of Nations memorials:
 Australian Memorial
 British Memorial – dedicated 2010
 Monument to Canadian Fallen – an identical monument is located in downtown Ottawa
 Commonwealth Memorial
 Commonwealth Missing in Action Memorial
 New Zealand Memorial – designed by Warren and Mahoney architects and built of marble from the Coromandel Peninsula
 South Africa Memorial – the 2001 sculpture Reconciliation by South African sculptor Strijdom van der Merwe, was created as part of the International Sculpture Symposium
 French Memorial – dedicated 2007
 Greek Memorial – dedicated 1961
 Interfaith memorial chapel – built by the United Nations Command in 1964
 Main gate – designed by Korean architect Kim Joong-up and built by the city of Busan in 1966. The end of the eight pillars supporting the roof was designed as a bowl and a symbol representing the moment and the eternity, expressing a soft and solemn standing for the soldiers.
 Memorabilia display hall – built by the UN in 1968
 Norwegian Memorial
 Thai Memorial – dedicated November 2008
 Turkish Memorials I and II – dedicated 1960, 1962, and 2008
 UN Forces Monument – dedicated 1978 and refurbished in 2007
 United States Korean War Memorial – the Frank Gaylord sculpture was carved from Barre Granite at the Rock of Ages Corporation in Barre, Vermont, and dedicated under the auspices of the American Battle Monuments Commission in 2013
 The Unknown Soldiers' Pathway

The Wall of Remembrance, completed in 2006, has the names of the 40,896 United Nations casualties (killed and missing) inscribed on 140 marble panels.

The UNMCK maintains a website in Korean, English, and Turkish, which allows website visitors to post online flowers and tributary messages.

Notable graves 

The cemetery contains the graves of 2,289 military personnel and 11 non-combatants. Amongst those are the graves of Bill Madden GC, third Battalion, Royal Australian Regiment, (who died as a prisoner of war), Kenneth Muir VC (killed in action in the Battle of Hill 282 while serving with the Argyll and Sutherland Highlanders), and Philip Curtis VC, Duke of Cornwall's Light Infantry (killed in action in the Battle of the Imjin River while serving with the Gloucestershire Regiment).  Also buried is Lt. Col. Charles Hercules Green DSO, commander of the 3rd Battalion, Royal Australian Regiment, who was mortally wounded at Battle of Chongju and died at nearby Anju. Dutch Lt. Col. Marinus Petrus Antonius den Ouden, commander of the Regiment Van Heutsz, was killed in action during Operation Roundup in 1951 and is buried with members of his regimentposthumously, den Ouden was awarded Netherlands' highest military award, the Military Order of William. In the early days of the war, journalist Christopher Buckley died from a land mine explosion, and was subsequently buried at the cemetery. Following his death in 2018, Korean War veteran and Victoria Cross recipient Bill Speakman was buried there in 2019.

Total burials 
Between 1951 and 1954 there were about 11,000 burials of UN troops from 21 countries. As of 2012, there are 2,300 wards of eleven countries, including 36 of the Republic of Korea troops deployed to the United Nations military bases. Because burials of seven countries' graves were retrieved back to their homeland, including Belgium, Colombia, Ethiopia, Greece, Luxembourg, Philippines and Thailand. The burials of British Commonwealth Forces Korea are located in United Nations Memorial Cemetery.  The numbers are 885 British troops, in accordance with the English customs of the dead.

Notes

See also 
 Daejeon National Cemetery
 Seoul National Cemetery
 War Memorial of Korea
 Cemetery for North Korean and Chinese Soldiers, established in Paju, South Korea
 Recovery of US human remains from the Korean War
 United Nations in popular culture

References

Further reading 
  A description of the post-interment processing of casualties undertaken at Kokura, Japan, in which they were identified and prepared for repatriation.

External links 

 
 South Africa War Graves Project: South Korea
 Korea 1953–1954 – for photographs of the cemetery in 1954 from the King's Own Royal Regiment Museum
 Wikivoyage Map 
 UNMCK at WikiMapia
 
 

1951 establishments in South Korea
1955 establishments in South Korea
1973 establishments in South Korea
Aftermath of the Korean War
Australian military cemeteries
British military memorials and cemeteries
Buildings and structures in Busan
Canadian military memorials and cemeteries
Cemeteries in South Korea
Military history of France during the Korean War
Korean War memorials and cemeteries
Monuments and memorials in South Korea
New Zealand military memorials and cemeteries
South African military personnel of the Korean War
Turkish military memorials and cemeteries outside Turkey
Tourist attractions in Busan